Mordellistena nigrobimaculata is a species of beetle in the genus Mordellistena of the family Mordellidae. It was described by Chabaut in 1924.

References

Beetles described in 1924
nigrobimaculata